The Aberdeen Research Consortium (ARC) is an alliance of Universities, Research Institutes and other institutions carrying out research-centred organisations in Aberdeen, Scotland.

The fundamental role of ARC is:

to co-ordinate the research activities of its members
to exploit and optimise research potential and
to add value to that provided by individual institutions.

These objectives are achieved by identifying new collaborative research opportunities and ensuring that there is a co-ordinated, strategic approach to utilisation and development of research facilities and equipment. In addition, ARC facilitates the co-ordination of research administration, including commercial exploitation of research, human resources and staff development and training.

They are:

University of Aberdeen
The Rowett Research Institute
Macaulay Land Use Research Institute
Fisheries Research Services
The Robert Gordon University
NHS Grampian
Scottish Agricultural College
Biomathematics & Statistics Scotland

Torry Food Science Laboratory Taskforce 
In June 1995, the ARC set up a taskforce to prevent the Torry Food Science Laboratory being relocated from Aberdeen to York. In July of that year, the taskforce (headed by Hugh Pennington) presented its proposals to Douglas Hogg, the Secretary of State for Agriculture. Hogg confirmed that the laboratory would close in 1996, but an announcement "on the consequential changes for the work currently undertaken by the laboratory" would be made shortly thereafter. The following October, it was announced that the ARC's argument that "[The Torry site's] work could be retained in Aberdeen without the need for extra funds" was accepted in part by Hogg, and that the scientific posts will be distributed equally between York and Aberdeen.

References

External links 

Research institutes in Scotland
Organisations based in Aberdeen